The Mass of the Phoenix is a ritual within Thelema, a philosophy and religion created and organized by author and occultist Aleister Crowley. The Mass was first printed as Chapter 44 in Crowley's The Book of Lies, published in 1913.

Within this ritual, the practitioner consumes a Cake of Light (a wafer made from meal, honey, olive oil, oil of Abramelin, and blood, semen, or both).

Description of the ritual

See also
"The Sect of the Phoenix" - story by Jorge Luis Borges

References

Thelema